Instituto Privado Argentino-Japonés (IPAJ), also known as , is a bilingual Spanish-Japanese elementary and middle school in Buenos Aires. It is the only school permitted by the Argentine Ministry of Education to require students to take Japanese, and it is the only bilingual Spanish-Japanese school in Buenos Aires. Its campus is located at Yatay 261 and Pringles 268 (two addresses for the same building) in the Almagro neighbourhood.

Ricardo Braginski of Clarín wrote that the school represented the community of Japanese descent in Buenos Aires.

History
The origins date from 1922. The Nichia Gakuin school began offering courses in 1927 and the bilingual day school was first established in 1938. Its initial location was Patagones 84. Argentine authorities closed the school in January 1945 upon the Argentine government declaring war against Japan as part of World War II. It reopened in 1947 and took the formal name "Instituto Privado Argentino-Japonés" in 1978. It moved to its current Yatay campus in 1984.

See also

 Japanese Argentine
 Buenos Aires Japanese Gardens
 Japanese Association of Rosario

References
  Ashihara, Kyoko (葦原 恭子 Ashihara Kyōko; Associate Professor Global Education Center, University of the Ryukyus). "Current Status and Issues of Japanese Language Education in Argentine : The Case of Instituto Privado Argentino Japones en Buenos Aires" (アルゼンチンにおける日本語教育の現状と課題 : ブエノスアイレス日亜学院の事例から (特集 文化共有集団による越境的ネットワークの国際比較研究 : ウチナーンチュとバスク人をめぐって)). Immigration Studies (移民研究) (12), 61–80, 2016–10. Center for Okinawa Migration Studies (沖縄移民研究センター). See profile at University of the Ryukyus Repository (琉球大学学術リポジトリ). See profile at CiNii. English abstract available.

Notes

Further reading
 Nichia gakuin 70 años (日亜学院創立70周年記念誌) or Instituto Privado Argentino Japonés, 1927-1997. Instituto Privado Argentino-Japonés. 1997 Printing. See profile at CiNii.
 Sekiguchi, Shinji (関口伸治). バイリンガル校としての日亜学院 Buenos dias Buenos Aires. MarucciPress (マルッチ・プレス), 1992. See profile at CiNii.

External links

 Instituto Privado Argentino-Japonés 

Schools in Buenos Aires
1927 establishments in Argentina
Educational institutions established in 1927
Asian-Argentine culture
Private schools in Argentina